The checkered pupfish (Cualac tessellatus) is a species of pupfish endemic to San Luis Potosí in Mexico where it is restricted to the Río Verde and associated waters, including the Media Luna lake (all part of the Pánuco River basin). It is the only known member of its genus.

References

Cyprinodontidae
Freshwater fish of Mexico
Taxa named by Robert Rush Miller
Fish described in 1956
Taxonomy articles created by Polbot